IOM soybeans is an industrial designation for soybeans from the U.S. states of Indiana, Ohio, and Michigan.  Beans grown in those states have a high protein content that is valued by processors, in particular in Japan.  IOM soybeans are traded on the following Japanese commodity exchanges:

 Kansai Commodities Exchange (KEX)
 Tokyo Grain Exchange (TGE) (including other US state origins);

and in the past were traded on:

 Central Japan Commodity Exchange (C-COM)
 Fukuoka Futures Exchange (FFE)

The Japanese contracts called "IOM soybeans" are unsegregated, meaning any mixture of genetically modified and not.  Non-GM IOM soybeans in Japan are usually just called "Non-GM soybeans".

References 

Soybean utilization FAQ, Karl E. Weingartner at the University of Illinois at Urbana-Champaign

Foreign trade of the United States
Soy products
Japan–United States relations